Felice Giuseppe Vertua, (1820 - 1862)  was an Italian painter. Vertua painted vedute with genre scenes and views of Cremona.

He was born and died in Cremona. We know little of his early training, but he became a follower of the painter Giuseppe Canella.

References

1820 births
1862 deaths
19th-century Italian painters
Italian male painters
Italian landscape painters
Painters from Cremona
19th-century Italian male artists